Avatime, also known as Afatime, Sideme, or Sia, is a Kwa language of the Avatime (self designation: Kedone (m.sg.)) people of eastern Ghana. The Avatime live primarily in the seven towns and villages of Amedzofe, Vane, Gbadzeme, Dzokpe, Biakpa, Dzogbefeme, and Fume.

Phonology
Avatime is a tonal language with three tones, has vowel harmony, and has been claimed to have doubly articulated fricatives.

Vowels
Avatime has nine vowels, though the vowels  have been overlooked in most descriptions of the language.

Avatime has vowel harmony. A root many not mix vowels of the relaxed  and contracted  sets, and prefixes change vowels to harmonize with the vowels of the root.

Vowels may be long or short. Records from 1910 showed that all vowels could be nasalized, but that is disappearing, and few words with nasal vowels remained by the end of the century.

Consonants

The language has been claimed to have doubly articulated fricatives . However, as with similar claims for Swedish , the labial articulation is not fricated, and these are actually labialized velars, .

Phonotactics
Syllables are V, CV, CGV, and N: Avatime allows consonant-approximant clusters, where the approximant may be . There is also a syllabic nasal, which takes its own tone:  "many".

Any consonant but  may form a cluster with :  "table",  "snake",  "chameleon",  "mucous".

When two vowels come together, they are either separated by a glottal stop , fuse into a single vowel, or the first vowel reduces to a semivowel.

However, there are /Cw/ and /Cj/ sequences which are not derived from vowel sequences.

Notes

External links
 The UCLA Phonetics Lab Archive: Avatime  - Phonetic fieldwork on Avatime

References

 
 

Languages of Ghana
Ghana–Togo Mountain languages